Chatterton was a small town in Adams Township, Warren County, in the U.S. state of Indiana.  It was founded in 1896 and included a school, a general store, and a post office that operated from 1900 to 1906.  Though it has since dwindled away completely, the location of the town persists on county maps, and is cited by the USGS.  The mailbox for the single house remaining at the site has "Chatterton" stenciled on it.

Geography 

References 

 Warren County Historical Society. A History of Warren County, Indiana (175th Anniversary Edition) (2002).

Former populated places in Warren County, Indiana
Populated places established in 1896
Ghost towns in Indiana